Longchaeus candidus is a species of sea snail, a marine gastropod mollusk in the family Pyramidellidae, the pyrams and their allies.

Description
The shell grows to a length of 14 mm.

Distribution
This species occurs in the following locations:
 Gulf of Mexico
 Caribbean Sea : Panama, Virgin Islands
 in the Atlantic Ocean off West Africa, North Carolina, the Bahamas, North Brazil

References

External links
 To Encyclopedia of Life
 To World Register of Marine Species

Pyramidellidae
Gastropods described in 1875